Jenckes is a surname. People with that name include:

Joseph Jenckes (disambiguation), three prominent early New England colonists
Marcien Jenckes, the Chief Executive Officer for Voxant, Inc, a new media company in Reston, Virginia
Thomas Jenckes (1818–1875), United States Congressional representative for the State of Rhode Island
Virginia E. Jenckes (1877–1975), U.S. Representative from Indiana

See also
E. N. Jenckes Store, historic store on Main Street in Douglas, Massachusetts
Jenckes House (Old Louisquisset Pike, Lincoln, Rhode Island), historic house
Jenckes Mansion, historic house at 837 Social Street, Woonsocket, Rhode Island
Whipple-Jenckes House (Liberty Jenckes House), historic American Colonial house at 2500 Diamond Hill Road, Cumberland, Rhode Island
Jencks (disambiguation)